San Ardo, formerly known as San Bernardo (Spanish for "St. Bernard"), is an unincorporated community and census-designated place (CDP) in Monterey County, California, United States. The population was 392 at the 2020 census, down from 517 in 2010.

History
The owner of the San Bernardo land grant, M.J. Brandenstein, laid out the town when the railroad reached his land in 1887. The San Bernardo post office opened in 1886, and changed its name to San Ardo in 1887. The former name of San Bernardo was changed to avoid confusion with San Bernardino, California.

Geography
San Ardo is near the point where the broad Salinas Valley has its southeastern terminus and pinches out within the converging portions of the California Coast Ranges, including the Santa Lucia Mountains on the west and the Cholame Hills and the Diablo Range on the east.

The Salinas River flows northward along the west side of the community.

Climate
This region experiences warm (but not hot) and dry summers, with no average monthly temperatures above 71.6 °F.  According to the Köppen Climate Classification system, San Ardo has a warm-summer Mediterranean climate, abbreviated "Csb" on climate maps.

Economy
Much of the local economy is based on agriculture (including farming and ranching), and servicing the oil field.

Demographics

2010
At the 2010 census San Ardo had a population of 517. The racial makeup of San Ardo was 252 (48.7%) White, 1 (0.2%) African American, 3 (0.6%) Native American, 5 (1.0%) Asian, 0 (0.0%) Pacific Islander, 245 (47.4%) from other races, and 11 (2.1%) from two or more races. Hispanic or Latino of any race were 363 people (70.2%).

The whole population lived in households, no one lived in non-institutionalized group quarters and no one was institutionalized.

There were 140 households, 76 (54.3%) had children under the age of 18 living in them, 82 (58.6%) were opposite-sex married couples living together, 16 (11.4%) had a female householder with no husband present, 13 (9.3%) had a male householder with no wife present.  There were 6 (4.3%) unmarried opposite-sex partnerships, and 1 (0.7%) same-sex married couples or partnerships. 22 households (15.7%) were one person and 9 (6.4%) had someone living alone who was 65 or older. The average household size was 3.69.  There were 111 families (79.3% of households); the average family size was 4.13.

The age distribution was 185 people (35.8%) under the age of 18, 66 people (12.8%) aged 18 to 24, 139 people (26.9%) aged 25 to 44, 83 people (16.1%) aged 45 to 64, and 44 people (8.5%) who were 65 or older.  The median age was 26.6 years. For every 100 females, there were 112.8 males.  For every 100 females age 18 and over, there were 129.0 males.

There were 158 housing units at an average density of 351.7 per square mile, of the occupied units 47 (33.6%) were owner-occupied and 93 (66.4%) were rented. The homeowner vacancy rate was 4.1%; the rental vacancy rate was 9.6%.  145 people (28.0% of the population) lived in owner-occupied housing units and 372 people (72.0%) lived in rental housing units.

2000
At the 2000 census there were 501 people, 157 households, and 110 families in the CDP. The racial makeup of the CDP was 47.90% White, 0.40% African American, 2.40% Native American, 0.40% Asian, 46.91% from other races, and 2.00% from two or more races. Hispanic or Latino of any race were 65.67%.

Of the 157 households 41.4% had children under the age of 18 living with them, 47.1% were married couples living together, 10.2% had a female householder with no husband present, and 29.3% were non-families. 24.2% of households were one person and 7.6% were one person aged 65 or older.  The average household size was 3.19 and the average family size was 3.82.

The age distribution was 35.3% under the age of 18, 11.8% from 18 to 24, 27.7% from 25 to 44, 15.8% from 45 to 64, and 9.4% 65 or older.  The median age was 27 years. For every 100 females, there were 106.2 males.  For every 100 females age 18 and over, there were 114.6 males.

The median household income was $25,208 and the median family income  was $31,500. Males had a median income of $30,417 versus $14,375 for females. The per capita income for the CDP was $11,379.  About 15.4% of families and 24.0% of the population were below the poverty line, including 32.5% of those under age 18 and 13.5% of those age 65 or over.

References

Further reading

Census-designated places in Monterey County, California
Salinas Valley
Unincorporated communities in Monterey County, California
Unincorporated communities in California